The 24th American Society of Cinematographers Awards were held on February 27, 2010, honoring the best cinematographers of film and television in 2009.

Winners and nominees

Film
 Christian Berger – The White Ribbon
 Barry Ackroyd – The Hurt Locker
 Dion Beebe – Nine
 Mauro Fiore – Avatar
 Robert Richardson – Inglourious Basterds

Television

Outstanding Achievement in Cinematography in Regular Series or PilotEagle Egilsson – Dark Blue (Episode: "Venice Kings") Jeffrey Jur, ASC – FlashForward (Episode: "The Gift")
 Michael Price – Ugly Betty (Episode: "There's No Place Like Mode")
 Christian Sebaldt, ASC – CSI: Crime Scene Investigation (Episode: "Family Affair")
 Glen Winter, CSC – Smallville (Episode: "Savior")

Outstanding Achievement in Cinematography in Miniseries or Television MovieAlar Kivilo, ASC, CSC – Taking Chance' Rene Ohashi, ASC, CSC – Jesse Stone: Thin Ice Jerzy Zieliński, ASC – The Courageous Heart of Irena Sendler''

References

2009 film awards
2009 guild awards
2009
American
2009 in American cinema